Ana Belén Palomo Jiménez (born 20 October 1977) is a freestyle swimmer from Spain, who competed for her native country at two consecutive Summer Olympics, starting in 2000 in Sydney, Australia. In both tournaments she was eliminated in the qualifying heats of the 50 m freestyle.

References

 Spanish Olympic Committee

1977 births
Living people
Spanish female freestyle swimmers
Olympic swimmers of Spain
Swimmers at the 2000 Summer Olympics
Swimmers at the 2004 Summer Olympics
Sportspeople from Algeciras
Mediterranean Games gold medalists for Spain
Mediterranean Games bronze medalists for Spain
Swimmers at the 2001 Mediterranean Games
Swimmers at the 2005 Mediterranean Games
Universiade medalists in swimming
Mediterranean Games medalists in swimming
Universiade bronze medalists for Spain
Medalists at the 1999 Summer Universiade